The oily bitterling (Tanakia limbata)  is a temperate freshwater fish belonging to the Acheilognathinae sub-family of the  family Cyprinidae.  It originates in creeks with fast-running water in central and southern Japan. It was originally described as Capoeta limbata by Temminck & Schlegel in 1846, and has also been referred to as Acheilognathus limbatus and Acheilognathus limbata in scientific literature.  The fish reaches a size of up to  TL.

References 

Freshwater fish of Japan
Endemic fauna of Japan
Tanakia
Taxa named by Coenraad Jacob Temminck
Taxa named by Hermann Schlegel
Fish described in 1846